A Successful Failure is a 1917 American silent comedy film directed by Arthur Rosson and starring Jack Devereaux, Winifred Allen and George Senaut. It was produced under the supervision of Allan Dwan.

Selected cast
 Jack Devereaux		
 Winifred Allen	
 George Senaut

References

Bibliography
 Robert B. Connelly. The Silents: Silent Feature Films, 1910-36, Volume 40, Issue 2. December Press, 1998.

External links
 

1917 films
1917 comedy films
1910s English-language films
American silent feature films
Silent American comedy films
American black-and-white films
Triangle Film Corporation films
Films directed by Arthur Rosson
1910s American films